Alexander Greenwald (born October 9, 1979) is an American musician, actor, and record producer. He is the lead vocalist of the California rock band Phantom Planet.

Life and career
Greenwald was born in Los Angeles, California, to a family of Jewish descent. In 1994, Greenwald formed Phantom Planet in his teens with four friends – guitarist Darren Robinson, bassist Sam Farrar, guitarist Jacques Brautbar, and drummer Jason Schwartzman. The band is best known for producing the song "California", which was used as the theme song of the teen drama The O.C., which lasted four seasons. Phantom Planet announced their hiatus on November 25, 2008.

In 2006, he collaborated with DJ Mark Ronson, to cover the Radiohead song, "Just". The cover appears on the compilation album Exit Music: Songs with Radio Heads, as well as the Mark Ronson album, Version. He appeared with Ronson at the 2007 Glastonbury Festival where he climbed up on to the lighting rig of the John Peel stage during the performance of "Just", and also sang "California". In 2010, he collaborated once again with Ronson on the album "Record Collection", on which Greenwald shares writing credits on six out of the eleven tracks. He became part of Ronson's band, The Business Intl. for this record. He was also a member of Los Angeles band blackblack, until 2007. At live shows, he was known for 1980s styled dance moves, which were inspired from watching David Byrne of the Talking Heads.

Greenwald is a vegan and has appeared in at least two ads for PETA. He told PETA his reasons for going vegan: "In college I stopped eating red meat on a bet with my girlfriend at the time. She bet she could stop smoking, and I bet that I could stop eating red meat. She started smoking again, so I won, which I'm always proud of.…I had been a vegetarian as a child for whatever reason. I guess kids sometimes follow their instincts…My friend dared me to go vegan as I was reading this book Fast Food Nation, which opened my eyes to a lot of cruelties.…Ever since then, I've been vegan and enjoyed it daily."

Greenwald co-produced and appeared on ex – Panic! at the Disco members Ryan Ross and Jon Walker's new band, The Young Veins debut record, Take a Vacation!.

He played bass and produced several tracks on The Like's second studio album Release Me.

He is currently part of the group Phases (previously named JJAMZ), and signed to Warner Bros. Records.

JJAMZ

JJAMZ was a band composed of Greenwald along with James Valentine (Maroon 5), Jason Boesel (Rilo Kiley/Conor Oberst), Michael Runion (solo), and Z Berg (The Like). The group was started at karaoke night at Guys in Hollywood. The band name is an acronym, using the first letter of each member's name. The group was a means of escape from each member's respective band at the time. "JJAMZ started at an interesting time in all of our lives. We all needed some kind of escape from relationships or our other bands. It was a tumultuous time, and the lyrics just came out. It was like word vomit. I can't remember," said Z Berg in one of their first interviews as a band. The band played their first concert at the Echo Plex on January 27, 2009. The band released their first and only album, Suicide Pact, on July 10, 2012. It was released through Dangerbird Records.

Phases
Following Valentine's departure from JJAMZ, the band changed its name to Phases. Signed to Warner Bros. Records, Phases is composed of Greenwald, Z Berg, Jason Boesel, and Michael Runion.

Mark Ronson & The Business International
Greenwald is the executive producer and one of the musicians in The Business International. He also helped to write several of the songs on their album Record Collection. He is one of the lead singers in the song 'The Night Last Night', and appeared the music video for "The Bike Song".

Cameos
In addition to the commercials for the Gap and his appearance in the 2001 film Donnie Darko, Greenwald appeared in two music videos for the electronica band M83 – "Don't Save Us From the Flames" and "Teen Angst", the video for Uffie's "ADD SUV" and also in videos for Mark Ronson, including the video for "Just".

Personal life
In 2013, Greenwald began a relationship with actress Brie Larson. In May 2016, Larson's representative confirmed that the pair were engaged. On January 10, 2019, it was reported that Greenwald and Larson had called off their engagement. In June 2020, it was confirmed that Greenwald and Australian actress Phoebe Tonkin were in a relationship.

Filmography

Discography
Solo
 Yo (2014)

With JJAMZ
 Suicide Pact (2012)

With Phases
 For Life (2015)

With Phantom Planet

 Phantom Planet Is Missing (1998)
 Polaroid (1998)
 The Guest (2002)
 Negatives (2004)
 Negatives 2 (2004)
 Phantom Planet (2004)
 Raise the Dead (2008)
 Devastator (2020)

With Blackblack
 Blackblack EP 1
 Blackblack EP 2
 BlackBlack (2006)

References

External links
 TheOCShow.com
 ASCAP.com
 PETAkids.com
 TheyWillRockYou.com
 Interview Magazine

1979 births
American male film actors
Male models from California
Musicians from Los Angeles
American rock singers
Living people
Male actors from Los Angeles
People from Mandeville Canyon, Los Angeles
Phantom Planet members
Jewish rock musicians
21st-century American singers
21st-century American male singers
Phases (band) members